Andreas Seppi was the defending champion, but chose to compete in the 2012 China Open.
Kenny de Schepper won the title, defeating Michaël Llodra 7–6(9–7), 4–6, 7–6(7–4) in the final.

Seeds

Draw

Finals

Top half

Bottom half

References
 Main Draw
 Qualifying Draw

Ethias Trophy - Singles
2012 Ethias Trophy